The Minister of State for Disability is a junior ministerial post at the Department of Children, Equality, Disability, Integration and Youth and the Department of Health of the Government of Ireland. The Minister works together with the senior Ministers in the departments and has special responsibility for disability issues. The Minister of State does not hold cabinet rank.

The first appointment of a Minister of State with responsibility for disability was in 1997. The Minister for Health has often also had responsibility for other areas of equality and health.

The current office-holder is Anne Rabbitte, TD who was appointed in July 2020.

List of office-holders

References

Disability
Department of Children, Equality, Disability, Integration and Youth